Goadby is a village and civil parish in the Harborough district of Leicestershire, England, about 8 miles north of Market Harborough. It had a population of 204 according to the 2011 census.

The village's name means 'farm/settlement of Gauti'.

Goadby has a Church of England Parish church, St. John the Baptist, which is of 13th-Century origin. The church was extensively renovated in the 19th Century. Services are held on the first Sunday of every month. The church is part of a group of churches ministered to from Billesdon. Every year, a fundraising fete is held in Goadby on the Saturday of the August Bank Holiday weekend to provide funds for the Church.

Goadby has no industry, and is notable chiefly for its stud farm, at which the celebrated race horse Desert Orchid was foaled.

Goadby's name, with the "-by" suffix, indicates that it is of Danish origin. Goadby is recorded in the Domesday Book as "Goutebi".

"Goadby, Leicester, is a chapelry in Billesdon parish near a branch of the river Welland. This is  annexed to the vicarage of Billesdon, in the diocese of Peterborough. The church was restored in 1854."

One of the current residents of Goadby is Kev Burgess, Racing Manager for Diamond Racing, the syndicate that owns 2021 Welsh Grand National and 2023 Classic Chase Winner, Iwilldoit.

References

External links

Villages in Leicestershire
Civil parishes in Harborough District